Acacia incurva is a shrub belonging to the genus Acacia. It is native to  the South West region of Western Australia.

The shrub has a low, multi-stemmed, erect or prostrate and spinescent habit. It blooms in the winter months between July and September producing spherical yellow inflorescences. Each simple globular inflorescence has sessile heads and contains between six and eleven bright yellow flowers. Each pod is crustaceous, reddish in colour with longitudinale nerves.
 
The species was first formally described by the botanist George Bentham in  1842 as part of William Jackson Hooker's work Notes on Mimoseae, with a synopsis of species in the London Journal of Botany. Synonyms for this species include; Racosperma incurvum, Acacia incurva var. brachyptera, Acacia incurva var. incurva and Acacia brachyptera.
 
The species is found in swamps, winter-wet areas and clay flats where it grows in sandy, clay or lateritic soils.

See also
List of Acacia species

References

incurva
Acacias of Western Australia
Plants described in 1842
Taxa named by George Bentham